The canton of La Verpillière is an administrative division of the Isère department, eastern France. Its borders were modified at the French canton reorganisation which came into effect in March 2015. Its seat is in La Verpillière.

It consists of the following communes:
 
Artas
Bonnefamille
Chamagnieu
Charantonnay
Diémoz
Frontonas
Grenay
Heyrieux
Oytier-Saint-Oblas
Roche
Saint-Georges-d'Espéranche
Saint-Just-Chaleyssin
Saint-Quentin-Fallavier
Satolas-et-Bonce
Valencin
La Verpillière

References

Cantons of Isère